Memoir of a Roadie is the 2020 autobiography of Joel A. Miller.  The book explores his relationships travelling and working for Guns N' Roses, Stone Temple Pilots, Poison, and The Cranberries and chronicles his further touring experiences with Black Sabbath, Ozzy Osbourne, Sharon Osbourne, Red Hot Chili Peppers, Foo Fighters, Oasis, Papa Roach, Disturbed, Godsmack, Warrant, Quiet Riot, NSYNC, Bush, No Doubt, Fishbone, Fuel, Korn, Metallica, Green Day, Kid Rock, Rage Against the Machine, Enuff Z'Nuff, The Turtles, Violent Femmes, Static-X, Third Eye Blind, Goo Goo Dolls, Slipknot, 3 Doors Down, and Veruca Salt.

References

External links 

https://www.iheart.com/podcast/53-appetite-for-distortion-27615384/episode/roadie-tales-and-ded-joe-71665304/
https://www.ultimate-guitar.com/news/general_music_news/gnr_roadie_recalls_how_really_pissed_axl_rose_fired_him_talks_how_scott_weiland_treated_him_when_he_worked_for_stp.html
https://lithub.com/coming-of-age-as-a-roadie/
https://jewishjournal.com/commentary/blogs/323187/joel-miller-on-his-new-book-memoir-of-a-roadie-judaisms-role-in-his-career/
https://anchor.fm/manifestbrutality/episodes/Interview-Joel-Miller-erc01f
https://podcasts.apple.com/us/podcast/ep-490-memoir-of-a-roadie/id389923845?i=1000510411976
https://www.hauraki.co.nz/shows/weekdays-with-tracey-donaldson/tracey-donaldson-interviews-joel-miller-the-former-roadie-for-gnr/

Music autobiographies
2020 non-fiction books